A price-weighted index is a stock market index where each constituent makes up a fraction of the index that is proportional to its component, the value would be:

 Adjustment Factor = Index specific constant "Z" / (Number of shares of the stock * Adjusted stock market value before rebalancing)

A stock trading at $100 will thus be making up 10 times more of the total index compared to a stock trading at $10. 

The Dow Jones Industrial Average and Nikkei 225 are examples of price-weighted stock market indexes.

See also
 Fundamentally based indexes
 Capitalization-weighted index

References

External links
 Price-weighted calculation methodology via Wikinvest

Business terms
Financial markets